One Corpse Too Many is a medieval mystery novel set in the summer of 1138 by Ellis Peters. It is the second novel in the Cadfael Chronicles, first published in 1979.

During the Anarchy, King Stephen takes Shrewsbury Castle and hangs all of the surviving defenders. Cadfael, a Benedictine monk of the nearby Shrewsbury Abbey discovers a murdered man hidden amongst the slain. He also has to help a young girl escape the siege, and discover the motives of Hugh Beringar – her betrothed fiancé.

When the novel was first published, the author was remarked for her knowledge of the historical era and ability to create it for the reader, yet "she never lets the meticulously researched place-and-time interfere with the canny puzzle, the flesh-and-blood characterization, or the sharp tension."

It was adapted for television in 1994 by Central for ITV.

Plot summary

In August 1138, King Stephen is besieging rebels now loyal to Empress Matilda in Shrewsbury Castle. Brother Cadfael welcomes the assistance of young Godric, brought to the Abbey by his aunt. Cadfael recognises that Godric is a girl. She is Godith Adeney, daughter of Fulke Adeney, a rebel leader inside the castle. Cadfael agrees to keep her secret, thus beginning 10 adventurous days.

Aline Siward and Hugh Beringar enter King Stephen's camp to pledge their loyalty. The King welcomes Aline Siward even though her absent brother Giles has declared for the Empress. He treats Hugh Beringar with more reserve, as he was betrothed as a child to Godith. To prove his loyalty, he is asked to find Godith and deliver her to the King. Beringar and Adam Courcelle, designated Deputy Sheriff once the castle falls, both fall for Aline on first sight. The castle falls the next morning, but FitzAlan and Adeney escape. Infuriated, King Stephen orders the ninety-four survivors of the turncoat garrison executed that very afternoon. Abbot Heribert of Shrewsbury Abbey offers to give Christian burial to the victims; King Stephen assents.

Counting the bodies, Cadfael finds not ninety-four, but ninety-five – one corpse too many. The extra corpse did not die by hanging, but by strangulation. Aline finds the body of her brother Giles among the ninety-four. Very upset, Courcelle gives Aline her brother's cloak. Later, Godric/Godith identifies the murdered man as Nicholas Faintree, a squire of FitzAlan. Cadfael visits Godith's old nurse, Petronilla Flesher for news. FitzAlan ordered squires Faintree and Torold Blund to slip out of the castle to take his treasury to safety in Wales, then to Normandy. She tells Cadfael that Beringar asked after Godith the day of the hangings, which means Beringar knows of the treasure.

Working in the corn harvest, Godric encounters a wounded man, Torold Blund. He relates how he and Faintree tried to carry FitzAlan's treasure as ordered. Faintree's horse was lamed by a caltrop, planted on the forested track not far from Frankwell. Faintree waited at a forest hut while Blund fetched a fresh horse. When Blund returned he found Faintree dead. Blund was attacked by a stranger, but escaped from him. Blund was blocked by the King's men on every road to Wales. He jumped into the river Severn in a hail of arrows, letting the horses go free. He hid the treasure under the bridge near the castle, hoping the soldiers took him for drowned.

Cadfael retraces Blund's path. In the hut, he finds a yellow topaz meant as decoration to a dagger in the dirt floor. Cadfael sends Godric with food and medicine to Blund, who is much recovered. Blund discovers that she is a girl named Godith. Cadfael joins them. He agrees to help them escape to Wales with the treasure. He and Blund hear footsteps, so stop their conversation. Later, Beringar asks Cadfael where he can conceal his two most valuable mounts before King Stephen raids for supplies. They take the horses to a grange belonging to the Abbey, south of Shrewsbury.

Cadfael sees that Hugh Beringar has a spirit like his own as to the cause of justice and a clever mind for pursuing it. He spends the next day testing his theory that Hugh is following him. Cadfael locates the treasure hidden in the river. He has a bundle matching it in appearance, which he carries to the grange. Once Beringar is away from the river, Godith and Blund fetch the treasure to a safe place.

Sheriff Prestcote begins the raids before Cadfael wakes. Godith wakes early, ensuring her own safety and that of the treasure. Aline tells Cadfael that Godric is safe with her. Blund spends the day on the run. He thinks, correctly, that Beringar saw him, yet did not seize him.

That night, Cadfael, Blund and Godith walk to the grange with the treasure. They hide the treasure in a tree that will be on the road to Wales, then swing back to approach the grange on the usual path. At the grange, Beringar and his men stop them. Beringar means to aid Godith in her escape, as his duty of honour. He wants the treasure for the King. Godith and Blund depart for Wales on Beringar's horses, pleased with Cadfael's success.

At Cadfael's workshop, Beringar finds the saddlebags filled with stones not treasure. He is mystified that they also contain Faintree's old clothes and the jewel from the dagger. Cadfael is thus satisfied Beringar had no part in Faintree's murder. Beringar laughs that Cadfael won the game, keeping the treasure with Godith. The two co-operate now. A beggar tells Cadfael events seen the night before the castle fell: Giles Siward slipped into the siege camp and betrayed FitzAlan's plan to the officer of the watch, Courcelle, in exchange for his life. Courcelle breaks the bargain, and then steals the dagger from Giles's corpse. Then Courcelle left the castle, to lay the trap for Faintree and Blund, seeking the treasure for himself. He fought with Blund in the hut. Beringar recalls Aline's mention of the family heirloom dagger lost when Giles was hanged. They conclude the murderer has the rest of the dagger.

Cadfael attends the farewell banquet for the King as servant to the Abbot. He sees a kitchen boy eating his own meal with Giles' missing dagger, fished from the Severn. At this banquet, Beringar accuses Courcelle of the murder of Faintree and the theft of the dagger, staking his life. He tosses the yellow topaz on the table. Cadfael gives the dagger to the King, who fits the two together, completing the proof. The boy identifies Courcelle. Courcelle denies all. The King is eager for justice, and impatient to move on. Instead of a trial, this will be settled by trial by combat, à l'outrance.

The lengthy combat between Beringar and Courcelle begins. Aline arrives knowing she loves Hugh Beringar. In close fighting, Courcelle falls on his own dagger blade and dies. With Beringar vindicated by fate, King Stephen appoints him Deputy Sheriff of Shropshire in Courcelle's place. He and Aline are betrothed. Cadfael, now his firm friend, gives him Giles's dagger, which has been restored by craftsmen at the Abbey, for Aline. Cadfael resolves to pray both for Nicholas Faintree, "a clean young man of mind and life", and for Adam Courcelle, "dead in his guilt", because "every untimely death, every man cut down in his vigour and strength without time for repentance and reparation, is one corpse too many."

Characters
Brother Cadfael: He is 58 years old, and a Benedictine monk at Shrewsbury Abbey since age 40. He is the herbalist after his life as man at arms and sailor in the Middle East. His Welsh ancestry is given as Cadfael ap Meilyr ap Dafydd (Cadfael son of Meilyr son of Dafydd). Born in 1080 in North Wales.
Hugh Beringar: Chooses to be a loyal servant to King Stephen, about 23 years old, as he recently came into his manors at Maesbury. He is of a height with Cadfael, but lithe and wiry in appearance. He is of the local landed aristocracy and a man of honour, who can muster six knights and some fifty men-at-arms, half of them skilled bowmen for the King. Hugh was engaged to Godith Adeney as part of an arranged marriage when he was a child. His family associated closely with FitzAlan and Adeney before the two chose to support the Empress Matilda in the Anarchy. Young, ambitious, confident and intelligent, he hopes to capture FitzAlan's treasury and use it to ingratiate himself with the King. In the process Beringar proves a capable rival to Cadfael, before allying with him. He is appointed Deputy Sheriff of Shropshire at the end of the story. He is attracted to Aline Siward.
Aline Siward: Recently orphaned young woman of rank, daughter of a supporter of King Stephen. Aline visits King Stephen at his camp to pledge her loyalty by bringing keys to her manors, which the King accepts. Her household can raise five knights, and more than forty men-at-arms for the King. This moment in her life is when she shows her own strength and makes her choices for her future. Pursued by two handsome young men in the King's camp, Adam Courcelle and Hugh Beringar. She is about 19 years old.
Giles Siward: Brother of Aline, five years older than her at age 24, who broke with the family to support Empress Maud some time ago. At the start of the story, Aline does not know where her brother is, with fighting in many places.
Father Elias: The priest of Saint Alkmond's parish in Shrewsbury, where Aline's family has a burial vault.
King Stephen: King Stephen is a historical figure. He took the castle of Shrewsbury, which had been held by his own deputy William FitzAlan, also a historical figure. Because he defeated turncoats, King Stephen ordered the 94 survivors to be hanged, starting with FitzAlan's uncle, Arnulf of Hesdin. In the novel, the many sides of King Stephen are developed: effective in battle, uninterested in administration, charming with people.
Gilbert Prestcote: Knight in service to King Stephen, about 50 years old. Involved in the hangings, and then deals with Cadfael over the murdered man among them. Chosen as Sheriff by the King to replace the turncoat FitzAlan.
Willem Ten Heyt: Captain of the Flemish soldiers serving King Stephen in this battle; his men are needed because Stephen cannot raise enough local men-at-arms and knights to succeed in the four-week battle. He relayed the order of the hangings of the traitors, per orders given him.
Abbot Heribert: Head of the Abbey of Saint Peter and Saint Paul from 1127 to 1138. His "anxious sweetness" is a contrast to his proud and ambitious subordinate, Prior Robert Pennant. Heribert appeals to King Stephen to permit the Christian burial of the rebels who defended the castle then assigns Cadfael to the task. Heribert is inclined to lenience and humility, and is a peace-loving man. He knows he is "in disfavour with the king, like all those who had been slow to rally to him with vociferous support." For the request to bury the hanged traitors, "the king would perhaps never forgive Abbot Heribert for the implied reproach, and the reminder of his Christian duty."
Adam Courcelle: Right-hand man and tenant to Gilbert Prestcote, and a supporter of King Stephen in the siege of Shrewsbury, designated to be deputy Sheriff upon victory. He is a hopeful suitor of Aline Siward. He is thirty years old, experienced at war, and treachery.
Godith Adeney: Seventeen-year-old daughter of Fulke Adeney, second in command to William FitzAlan. Caught by the rapid defeat, she disguised herself as a boy and was brought to the Abbey to help Brother Cadfael as Godric. She maintains her disguise for 8 days.
Brother Paul: Abbey monk responsible for teaching the lay students and novices, including Godric.
Edric Flesher: Chief of the butcher's guild in Shrewsbury, husband to Petronilla late in life, and supporter of Fulke Adeney.
Petronilla: Now wife of Edric Flesher. Earlier in life, she was nurse to Godith Adeney.
Torold Blund: Young squire of William FitzAlan, one of two assigned to carry Adeney's fortune out of England and take Adeney's daughter to safety. Torold, of Saxon heritage and name, was both neighbour and friend of Nicholas Faintree, both the same age. Brother Cadfael gives him the last memento of his own military life, kept these many years, his poniard.
Nicholas Faintree: Young squire of William FitzAlan, usually carried messages further north in the county, well known to the Adeney family. His is the one corpse too many, as identified by Godric/Godith after the corpse is brought to the Abbey church. The cause of justice for his death is taken up by Brother Cadfael and later by his new confederate.
Ulf: Distant kin to Torold Blund with a holding near the hut where he and his friend encountered the caltrops on the path. Cadfael seeks him out to learn more of the truth of the events in the hut, especially the caltrops.
Bishop Roger of Salisbury: Justiciar for King Stephen, he rejoins the King when he took over Shrewsbury Castle for a few days after taking it, and is present at the large dinner held by the King. Real historical person, whose major role was in the time of old King Henry, but gave rise to some of King Stephen's problems with the clergy early in his reign. Three of his nephews joined the clergy, including Nigel, bishop of Ely.
Lame Osbern: Disfigured beggar who sets up at King Stephen's camp for the warmth of the fires and hope of alms, then follows him to the castle. Brother Cadfael selects him to receive as alms the cape of Aline's dead brother; this connection is key to learning one essential clue to both the death of Giles and the murder of Nicholas Faintree.
Anselm and Louis: Lay brothers who stay at the grange, an outlying holding of the Abbey, with stables. It is an assart in the forest to the west of Shrewsbury proper and lately not much used. They are strong men who carry weapons.

Themes
The quality of loyalty to a cause or a person is a recurring theme throughout the work, as characters declare their loyalty to a cause or person only for that loyalty to be tested, sometimes to breaking point. The novel begins with a triple betrayal: Giles Siward betrays the cause of Empress Maud, the plans of his lord FitzAlan and the two squires entrusted with the treasury, to King Stephen's sheriff, Courcelle. Courcelle then betrays the cause of King Stephen and Giles Siward out of greed.

The contrast between justice and expedience is another theme explored at the beginning and end of the novel, with King Stephen's expedient justice in war time treading a difficult line between both. Yet the King's desire to move on does reveal the better man for his cause, and allow his newest adherent to prove his loyalty to the King while following his notions of honour and justice.

Setting in history
The story takes place during The Anarchy, a term referring to the 19-year civil war between King Stephen and the Empress Maud, from 1135 to 1153. King Stephen, William Fitz-Alan, his uncle Arnulf of Hesdin, Abbot Heribert, and Prior Robert Pennant are all real people. Son of Alan fitz Flaad, baron of Oswestry, William FitzAlan was appointed Sheriff in 1137 by King Stephen. FitzAlan did go over to the Empress Matilda and held Shrewsbury Castle in her name. There was a battle lasting four weeks in July and August, during which Arnulf hurled much verbal abuse of the attacking King Stephen, and which Stephen won. Stephen indeed hanged all the defenders of the castle after taking it, save William who had escaped before Stephen's final success.

Wales is a preferred escape route from Shropshire and environs to France in the time of Anarchy, as the prince of Gwynedd, the principality of northern Wales, takes no side in the conflict and is pleased to have the English fighting each other, and not him. FitzAlan, with roots in that border area, had a relationship with Owain Gwynedd so he or his messengers could ask for the prince's protection to ride across to a port and seek ship for Normandy.

Trial by combat, used at the end to settle the guilt of Courcelle on one count of murder and another of theft not fit for an officer and gentleman, was used in England in the Middle Ages, especially from the time of the Norman conquest to the reign of King Henry II, who introduced a more efficient system of jury trials, but extending to the 16th century. When King Stephen uttered "à l'outrance", he meant the combat had to be to the death of one of the two. The phrase means to the uttermost in some usages, but to the death in this usage.

In the novel, the body of a murdered man is slipped in among the bodies of the executed defenders; hence, there is one corpse too many.

The story takes place in Shropshire (also called Salop) in England. Shrewsbury Abbey and its outlying grange, the real town of Shrewsbury and its suburb Frankwell on the road to Wales are the locations for most of the story's action.

Critical reception

Kirkus Reviews finds the author has improved on the first book with this novel:

A second, even smoother medieval adventure for Brother Cadfael (A Morbid Taste for Bones)—once a Crusader and man of the world, now an accomplished herbalist at the monastery in 12th-century Shrewsbury, a town racked by civil war. King Stephen has conquered, his enemies have all been massacred, but—while preparing these nameless bodies for Christian burial—Cadfael finds one to be the victim of a more personal sort of murder. So he tries to identify both victim and murderer... while aiding two heroic young people on the lam. And his ambivalent cohort in detection is valiant Hugh Beringar, whose hand-to-hand combat with the murderer wraps things up with a zing. Peters (who writes full-blown historicals as Edith Pargeter) makes the most of the medieval atmosphere, but she never lets the meticulously researched place-and-time interfere with the canny puzzle, the flesh-and-blood characterization, or the sharp tension. A must for fans of mysteries in period settings—and good enough to win over a few who've previously shied away from that delicate subgenre.

Fantastic Fiction's website reprints the following quote: "Each addition to the series is a joy. Long may the chronicles continue." from a review from USA Today.

Publication history

There are seven hardback publications including the first in 1979, and about two dozen paperback editions of this book, in English, published in the UK or the US, listed at Fantastic Fiction. A sample follows:

1979, United Kingdom, Macmillan,  / 978-0-333-27003-5, 19 July 1979, Hardback
1980, USA, William Morrow & Co,  / 978-0-688-03630-0, May 1980, Hardback
1982, United Kingdom, Ulverscroft Large Print Books Ltd,  / 978-0-7089-0788-7, May 1982, Hardback
1985, USA, Little Brown and Co.,  / 978-0-07-515021-3, April 1985, Hardback
1995, (USA edition) Little Brown and Co. (UK),  / 978-0-07-515021-3 April 1995 Hardback
1997, (UK edition) Chivers Large print (Chivers, Windsor, Paragon & Co),  / 978-0-7540-1015-9, November 1997
1980, (UK edition) Littlehampton Book Services Ltd,  / 978-0-417-05230-4, October 1980 Paperback
1994, (USA edition) Grand Central Publishing,  / 978-0-446-40051-0, March 1994, Paperback
2010, (UK edition), Sphere,  / 978-0-7515-4372-8 Paperback

Thirteen audio book editions have been issued, beginning in June 1990. The most recent include audio CD edition in September 2010 by Blackstone Audiobooks  / 9781433264702, and in January 2012 an audio cassette edition  / 9781445016313 and two audio CD editions by ISIS Audio Books ( / 9781445016337 and  / 9781445016320).

This book has been translated to other languages, with entries in the French and Italian versions of Wikipedia.

Adaptations

Television

One Corpse Too Many was the first Cadfael book to be adapted for television by Carlton Media for distribution worldwide, in 1994. The Cadfael series eventually extended to thirteen 75-minute episodes, all of which starred Sir Derek Jacobi as the sleuthing monk. It was directed by Graham Theakson, the screenplay was by Russell Lewis, and the cast featured Sean Pertwee as Hugh Beringar, Christian Burgess as Adam Courcelle and Michael Grandage as King Stephen. The series was filmed mostly in Hungary. The adaptation for One Corpse Too Many stuck closely to the original novel, with only minor plot or script deviations to cater for the different medium.

The episode was one of four released in an audio format with linking narration by Acorn Media.

Radio
The book was also adapted for BBC Radio 4 in 1990, starring Glyn Houston as Brother Cadfael and Geoffrey Whitehead as Adam Courcelle. It has several times been rebroadcast on BBC Radio 7, later on BBC Radio 4 Extra.

References

External links

1978 British novels
British mystery novels
Novels by Edith Pargeter
Fiction set in the 1130s
Novels set in the 12th century
Novels set in Shropshire
Macmillan Publishers books
Historical mystery novels